Monochamus basigranulatus is a species of beetle in the family Cerambycidae. It was described by Stephan von Breuning in 1952. It is known from the Democratic Republic of the Congo.

References

basigranulatus
Beetles described in 1952
Endemic fauna of the Democratic Republic of the Congo